Margaret Strickland (c. 1880–1970) was a prolific English writer of magazine stories and novels for adults and children, including the Michael Gerahty detective novels. Her works and papers have been collected by New York University's Fales Library.

Family connections
Strickland was a great niece of the famous literary Strickland sisters. Her grandfather, Thomas Strickland, was the youngest brother of Agnes, Jane and Elizabeth Strickland, and Catherine Traill. Agnes was the best known of the family and is remembered for her work, The Lives of the Queens of England (1840–48). Strickland suggests that Thomas was viewed as the black sheep of the family. He is barely mentioned in either of the biographies of Agnes Strickland. Several of Thomas' siblings, including Catherine and another brother, Samuel, migrated to Canada, where Catherine wrote a number of books and novels, and Samuel founded the city of Lakeside.

Strickland had two sisters, both noted for their ability in drawing animals and staid, country scenes. Agnes Strickland is remembered for her botanical illustrations, and Mary Diana (later Diana Mallet-Veale) moved to Rhodesia and became well known for her illustrations of native life. Early examples of the artistic work by these sisters include twelve issues of the Illustrated Amateur Magazine, a small publication Strickland created with her sisters from 1897 to 1899.

Works
Strickland's adult stories are often of a romantic nature, involving the upper and middle classes and incorporating mystery or suspense.

References

1880s births
1970 deaths